Vegayammapeta is a village in the municipality of Ramachandrapuram, East Godavari, in the Indian state of Andhra Pradesh.

Villages in East Godavari district